The Mid-American Conference men's basketball tournament is the NCAA Division I postseason single-elimination tournament for the Mid-American Conference (MAC).  The winner of the tournament receives the MAC's automatic bid to the NCAA Men's Division I Basketball Championship. As of the next MAC tournament in 2021, the top eight teams in conference play will qualify for the tournament. Since 2000, the MAC Tournament has been held at Rocket Mortgage FieldHouse in Cleveland and is planned to be held there through at least 2030. The finals are broadcast on ESPN2 and the semi and quarterfinals are broadcast on Spectrum Sports and ESPN3.

The tournament was first played in 1980 and expanded to include all conference members in 2000. The tournament continued to involve all conference members (barring postseason bans due to NCAA sanctions) through the 2020 edition, which was canceled in progress due to the COVID-19 pandemic. In May 2020, as part of a broader suite of changes to MAC postseason tournaments triggered by the pandemic, the MAC announced it would reduce its men's and women's basketball tournaments to 8 teams, with all qualifying teams playing in Cleveland. Additionally, the MAC eliminated its basketball divisions and increased its conference schedule from 18 to 20 games. These changes will remain in place through at least the 2023–24 season. Ball State, Kent State, and Ohio have the most tournament championships with seven.

Format
Seeding for the tournament is determined by winning percentage in conference play; during the era of MAC divisional play, divisional alignment did not figure into tournament seeding. The following tiebreakers are used:

1. Between two teams:
A. Head-to-head competition; B. Division Record (only used if the two teams in question are tied for the Division lead); C. Winning percentage vs. ranked conference teams (top to bottom, regardless of division, vs. common opponents regardless of the number of times played); D. Coin flip

2. For multiple (3 or more) team ties:
A. Total won-lost record/winning percentage of games played among the tied teams; B. Two (2)-team tie-breaker procedure goes into effect

Historical formats
From 2016 through the abbreviated 2020 edition, all 12 conference members participated in the tournament. The top four seeds received byes into the quarterfinals; seeds 5-12 played first-round games at the campus of the higher seed.  Winners of the first-round games advanced to face the top four seeds in the quarterfinal round in Cleveland.

From 2012 through 2015, the No. 1 and No. 2 seeds received byes straight to the semifinals, with the No. 3 and No. 4 seeds beginning tournament play in the quarterfinals.  Teams seeded 5–12 played an additional two rounds.  First round games were played at the home sites of the higher seeds, with the remaining rounds being contested at Rocket Mortgage FieldHouse, then known as Quicken Loans Arena.  Under this format, a team seeded fifth or lower had to win four games in six days, while playing five games in eight days, to win the conference tournament.  The division winners were guaranteed to receive a seed not lower than four.

From 2002 through 2011, the format for the conference tournament was similar to the 2016 through 2020 format.  Each conference member received a berth in the tournament, with the top four seeds receiving byes into the quarterfinals.  Unlike the current format, division winners were guaranteed at least the No. 2 seed.  First round games for seeds 5–12 were played at the home sites of the higher seeds, with the remaining rounds being contested at Quicken Loans Arena.

From 1980 through 1988, seven teams qualified for the three-round tournament.  The No. 1 seed received a bye into the semifinals.  In 1989, an eighth team was added and each of the teams participated in all three rounds.  The tournament was expanded in 2000 to four rounds and included all 13 conference teams.  The top three teams received byes into the quarterfinals.

Tournament champions

Performance by school

* No longer member of MAC

Broadcasters

See also
Mid-American Conference women's basketball tournament

References

 
Recurring sporting events established in 1980